Web filtering in schools blocks students from inappropriate content across the web, while allowing sites that are selected by school administrators.  Rather than simply blocking off large portions of the Internet, many schools are utilizing customizable web filtering systems that provide them with greater control over which sites are allowed and which are blocked.

By region

United States

The Children's Internet Protection Act (CIPA) requires that U.S. schools have appropriate measures in place to protect students from obscene or harmful online content in order to be eligible for discounts on internet access or internal connections through the Schools and Libraries Program of the Universal Service Fund, commonly known as the E-Rate program. There are a number of commercially available free and paid services that allow schools to meet CIPA requirements and receive the discount.

Other countries
These practices exist in Australia, the United Kingdom, New Zealand and Canada, among others. Such filtering blocks Netflix, YouTube, Facebook, Twitter, Instagram, certain games and more.

Types

The FCC and CIPA do not specify how the filtering needs to be done, so most schools are using a combination of DNS, browser and firewall-based filtering.

DNS filtering 

The DNS filtering happens at the domain resolution layer of the Internet and does not allow the IP address of an obscene or harmful website to be discovered. There are multiple paid products that perform such work, but many schools are leveraging free solutions to filter non-safe sites.

Browser filtering 

Some browser extensions allow parental controls to be enabled to restrict non-desirable website categories. For CIPA, those categories include any website with adult-only content.

Firewall-based filtering 

Firewall-based filtering can be done at the IP layer or using Web proxies to intercept and filter HTTP and HTTPS requests to websites that are not kid-safe. This type of solution is difficult to implement as much of the web is moving to HTTPS, so it does not have a high efficiency.

SafeSearch filtering 

Google SafeSearch helps filter out explicit adult material from Google Search results and can be enabled by default in schools.

Bypassing
There are ways to bypass web filtering at schools which puts students back in control of the web. VPNs and hotspots are the most scientifically proven popular options used by students to get around filtering at school in order to regain access to blocked sites. VPNs hide the IP address location from filtering while hotspots are WiFi used on phones.

See also
Don't Filter Me

References

Internet safety
Child safety
Cyberbullying
Internet censorship in the United States
Internet censorship
Educational technology